King of Hearts is a 1936 British romance film directed by Oswald Mitchell and Walter Tennyson and starring Will Fyffe, Richard Dolman and Googie Withers. It was produced by Butcher's Film Service, and made at Cricklewood Studios in London.

Synopsis
A working-class boy falls in love with a working-class girl.

Cast
 Will Fyffe as Bill Saunders 
 Gwenllian Gill as May Saunders 
 Richard Dolman as Jack Ponsonby 
 Amy Veness as Mrs. Ponsonby 
 O. B. Clarence as Mr. Ponsonby 
 Jock McKay as George 
 Googie Withers as Elaine 
 Margaret Davidge as Mrs. Saunders 
 Ronald Shiner as Tomkins 
 Patrick Ludlow as Reggie

References

Bibliography
 Low, Rachael. Filmmaking in 1930s Britain. George Allen & Unwin, 1985.
 Wood, Linda. British Films, 1927-1939. British Film Institute, 1986.

External links
 
 
 

1936 films
1936 romantic comedy films
British black-and-white films
Films directed by Oswald Mitchell
Films directed by Walter Tennyson
British romantic comedy films
Films shot at Cricklewood Studios
1930s English-language films
1930s British films